Zabaia (or Zabaya) ruled the ancient Near East city-state
of Larsa from 1877 BC to 1868 BC (short chronology). He was an Amorite and the son of
Samium.

See also

Chronology of the ancient Near East

Notes

External links

Amorite kings
19th-century BC Sumerian kings
Kings of Larsa
19th-century BC people